The Last Horseman is a 1944 American Western film directed by William Berke and starring Russell Hayden, Dub Taylor, and Ann Savage.

Cast
 Russell Hayden as Lucky Rawlins  
 Dub Taylor as Cannonball  
 Bob Wills as Bob  
 The Texas Playboys as Musicians, Cowhands  
 Ann Savage as Judy Ware  
 John Maxwell as Cash Watson  
 Frank LaRue as Rance Williams  
 Nick Thompson as Henchman Karp  
 Blackie Whiteford as Henchman Slade  
 Ted Mapes as Duke Cudlow  
 Forrest Taylor as Bert Saunders

References

Bibliography
 Morton, Lisa & Adamson, Kent. Savage Detours: The Life and Work of Ann Savage. McFarland, 2009.

External links
 

1944 films
1944 Western (genre) films
1940s English-language films
American Western (genre) films
Columbia Pictures films
Films directed by William A. Berke
American black-and-white films
1940s American films